Language and Linguistics: An Introduction is a 1981 book by Sir John Lyons.

Reception
The book was reviewed by Louis Mangione and Patricia A. Lee.

References

External links
Language and Linguistics: An Introduction
1981 non-fiction books
Linguistics textbooks
Cambridge University Press books